Sarcodon imbricatus, commonly known as the shingled hedgehog or scaly hedgehog, is a species of tooth fungus in the order Thelephorales. The mushroom is edible.  Many sources report it has a bitter taste, but others have found it delicious and suspect that the bitter specimens may be similar related species. The mushroom has a large, brownish cap with large brown scales and may reach 30 cm (12 in) in diameter. On the underside it sports greyish, brittle teeth instead of gills, and has white flesh. Its spore print is brown. It is associated with spruce (Picea), appearing in autumn. It ranges throughout North America and Europe, although collections from the British Isles are now assigned to the similar species Sarcodon squamosus.

Taxonomy
The Swedish botanist Olof Celsius reported in 1732 that Sarcodon imbricatus occurred in the vicinity of Uppsala, and Carl Linnaeus wrote of it in his 1737 work Flora lapponica. It was one of the species initially described by Linnaeus, as Hydnum imbricatum, in the second volume of his Species Plantarum in 1753. The specific epithet is the Latin imbricatus meaning "tiled" or "with overlapping tiles". It was then placed in the genus Sarcodon by Finnish mycologist Petter Adolf Karsten in 1881.

For many years, Sarcodon imbricatus was described associated with both spruce and pine, although the latter forms were smaller and noted to be more palatable by mushroom hunters in Norway. Furthermore, the mushroom has been used as a source of pigment and collectors noted that fresh specimens collected under pine yielded pigment, but only old ones collected under spruce. Molecular analysis of the DNA revealed the two forms to be distinct genetically, and thus populations of what had been described as S. imbricatus were now assigned to Sarcodon squamosus, which includes collections in the British Isles and the Netherlands.

Description
The mushrooms, or fruiting bodies, can be quite large in size. The brownish or buff cap measures up to 30 cm (12 in) in diameter and is covered with coarse darker brown scales, becoming darker and upturned with age. It is funnel-shaped. The underside bears soft, pale grey 'teeth' rather than gills. These are 0.5–1.5 cm long, grayish brown (darkening with age), and brittle. The spores are brown.

Similar species
From above, it may be confused with the old man of the woods (Strobilomyces strobilaceus) as both have a similar shaggy cap. The bitter and inedible Sarcodon amarascens can be distinguished by its bluish-black stripe. S. scabrosus is also similar.

Distribution and habitat
The fruit bodies of Sarcodon imbricatus grow in association with firs (Abies), especially in hilly or mountainous areas, and can appear on sandy or chalk soils in fairy rings. The usual fruiting season in August to October. It ranges throughout North America and Europe, although collections from the British Isles are now assigned to another species, Sarcodon squamosus.

Uses

Old mushrooms of Sarcodon imbricatus and related species contain blue-green pigments, which are used for dyeing wool in Norway.

Edibility
The fungus can be bitter, although this is less apparent in younger specimens. Submerging the mushrooms in boiling water will remove this. It can be pickled or dried and used as flavouring. In Bulgaria it is collected, dried and finely ground to be used as an aromatic mushroom flour. It is reported as edible but of poor quality in the United States by some sources but as deliciously edible by others. It may cause gastrointestinal upsets.

In Korea, mushroom tea is made from it.

Distinctive spicy aroma of fried younger specimens has made it an expensive delicacy on Japanese food market.

References

External links
Sarcodon imbricatus at Mushroom Expert

imbricatus
Edible fungi
Fungi described in 1753
Fungi of Europe
Fungi of North America
Taxa named by Carl Linnaeus